Ruth Mitchell was an American reporter who fought with the Chetnik guerrillas in World War II.

Ruth Mitchell may also refer to:
 Ruth Alex Mitchell (journalist) (1947–2010), British journalist
 Ruth Comfort Mitchell Young (1882–1954), American author and playwright who wrote as Ruth Comfort Mitchell 
 Ruth Crawford Mitchell, founding director of the University of Pittsburgh's Nationality Rooms
Ruth Mitchell (stage manager) (1919–2000), American stage manager